Berg Automobile Company was a manufacturer of  automobiles in Cleveland, Ohio, established by Hart O. Berg and operational from 1903 to 1904. The New York Bergs were made by the Worthington Automobile Company.

The 1904 Berg was a touring car model.  Equipped with a tonneau, it could seat 6 passengers and sold for US$3500.  The vertical-mounted straight-4, situated at the front of the car, produced 24 hp (17.9 kW).  A 4-speed sliding transmission was fitted.  The armored wood-framed car used semi-elliptic springs and was considered quite advanced for the time. The wheelbase was 90 inches long.

References

 Frank Leslie's Popular Monthly (January, 1904)

Veteran vehicles
Defunct motor vehicle manufacturers of the United States
Vehicle manufacturing companies established in 1903
Defunct manufacturing companies based in Ohio